The 1912 United States presidential election in Maine  took place on November 5, 1912, as part of the 1912 United States presidential election which was held throughout all contemporary 48 states. Voters chose six representatives, or electors to the Electoral College, who voted for president and vice president. 

Maine was won by the Democratic nominees, New Jersey Governor Woodrow Wilson and Indiana Governor Thomas R. Marshall. Wilson and Marshall defeated incumbent President William Howard Taft, and his running mate Vice President James S. Sherman and Progressive Party candidates, former President Theodore Roosevelt and his running mate California Governor Hiram Johnson. 

Wilson won Maine by a narrow margin of 2.02%, becoming the first Democratic presidential candidate since Franklin Pierce in 1852 to win the state. This would be the final time until Lyndon B. Johnson won the state in 1964 where a Democratic presidential candidate would carry Maine.

This was the only state that Wilson won in either of his two victories that would never support fellow Democrat Franklin D. Roosevelt in any of his landslide victories in the 1930s and 1940s. 

With 37.41% of the popular vote, Maine would prove to be Roosevelt's fifth strongest state in terms of popular vote percentage in the 1912 election after South Dakota, California, Michigan and Minnesota.

Election

The Maine Republican Party supported Theodore Roosevelt during the 1912 Republican presidential primaries against President William Howard Taft. The Progressive Party was founded by Roosevelt supporters on July 31, 1912, at a convention in Portland, Maine. The Republicans was weakened after losing members including Charles H. Hitchborn, who was the treasurer of the party, although Warren C. Philbrook, the chair of the party, remained. Roosevelt's largest amount of support came from Aroostook County where he received over sixty percent of the vote. Three-fourths of Roosevelt's votes, worth 38,000 votes, came from Republicans while the remainder, worth 10,000 votes, came from Democrats.

Results

Results by county

See also
 United States presidential elections in Maine

Notes

References

Maine
1912
1912 Maine elections